Eurotiomycetidae is a subclass of the Eurotiomycetes.

Subdivisions 
According to Mycobank, Eurotiomycetidae is currently subdivided as follows:
 Orders
 Arachnomycetales
 Ascosphaerales
 Coryneliales
 Elaphomycetales
 Eurotiales
 Onygenales
 Families incertae sedis
 Amorphothecaceae
 Ascosphaeraceae
 Eremascaceae
 Monascaceae
 Genera incertae sedis
 Azureothecium

References

External links

Eurotiomycetes
Fungus subclasses
Taxa described in 1988